David Howells (born 15 December 1967) is an English football coach and former professional footballer.

As a player, he was a midfielder who notably played in the Premier League for Tottenham Hotspur and Southampton. He played 277 times for Spurs in the league and scored 22 goals, winning the FA Cup in 1991. He also played in the Football League with Bristol City, before finishing his career in non-league football with Hartley Wintney, Havant & Waterlooville and Guildford City.

Following retirement, he was director of football at Guildford City, has worked as an agent and is now a secondary school teacher.

Football career
Born in Guildford, Surrey, Howells made his debut for Tottenham Hotspur as an 18-year-old in 1986, scoring in a 2–1 win against Sheffield Wednesday. He spent 12 more seasons at White Hart Lane, made 335 first-team appearances, and was on the winning side in the 1991 FA Cup Final. Howells also represented Southampton, scoring once against Arsenal, and Bristol City before retiring from the game in 2000 due to a persistent knee problem.

Later career
He went on to run holiday resort-based soccer schools, was involved with Guildford City as director of football and occasional player, appeared for Havant & Waterlooville, coached at Westfield (Surrey), and became a director of a sports agency.

Howells used to teach at Queen Eleanor's junior school in Guildford. He was subsequently appointed head coach of the first XI at Charterhouse. He now teaches at Farnham Heath End School.

Personal life
Howells has a younger brother, Gareth, who is also a professional footballer, playing in goal. As of 2010–11 season, Gareth is a player/coach at Eastleigh FC. Like his brother, Gareth was originally signed on youth terms at Tottenham, but never made the step up to play professionally for the club, and has spent almost his entire career at clubs outside of the Football League structure.

References

External links
 
 Stats and photos at Sporting Heroes

1967 births
Living people
Sportspeople from Guildford
English footballers
Association football midfielders
Tottenham Hotspur F.C. players
Southampton F.C. players
Bristol City F.C. players
Guildford City F.C. players
Hartley Wintney F.C. players
Havant & Waterlooville F.C. players
English Football League players
Premier League players
Footballers from Surrey
FA Cup Final players